Shavkat Mullajanov  (born 19 January 1986) is an Uzbek professional football player who currently plays for Uzbekistan national football team. His position is center back, but he can also play as a right back.

Career
After his great performance at the 2011 AFC Asian Cup he left for Qatar, to play for Al-Ahli. He was also the first player on the Uzbekistan's team to transfer to another club after the Asian Cup. Over the span of two seasons with Al Ahli, he received 12 yellow cards and 2 red cards in 29 games.

On 5 July 2012, it was announced that Mullajanov would join Al Nasr SC in Saudi Arabia. Mullajanov transferred to Chinese Super League side Liaoning Whowin on 27 February 2013.

Honours

Club
Lokomotiv
Uzbek League runners-up (2): 2014, 2015
Uzbek Cup (1): 2014
Uzbekistan Super Cup (1): 2015

References

External links
Shavkat Mullajanov- Goal.com 

1986 births
Living people
Uzbekistani footballers
Uzbekistani expatriate footballers
Uzbekistan international footballers
2011 AFC Asian Cup players
2015 AFC Asian Cup players
Al Ahli SC (Doha) players
Al Nassr FC players
Liaoning F.C. players
Al-Shaab CSC players
PFK Metallurg Bekabad players
Qatar Stars League players
Saudi Professional League players
Chinese Super League players
UAE Pro League players
Expatriate footballers in Qatar
Expatriate footballers in Saudi Arabia
Expatriate footballers in China
Expatriate footballers in the United Arab Emirates
Uzbekistani expatriate sportspeople in Qatar
Uzbekistani expatriate sportspeople in Saudi Arabia
Uzbekistani expatriate sportspeople in China
Uzbekistani expatriate sportspeople in the United Arab Emirates
Association football defenders